is a Japanese web manga series written and illustrated by Waka Hirako. It was serialized on Kadokawa's josei manga website Comic Bridge from July to December 2019.

Characters

Mariko Ikagawa

Makio

Mariko's father

Kyoko Tamura

Media

Manga
Kadokawa collected its four chapters in a single tankōbon volume, released on January 8, 2020.

In North America, the manga was licensed for English release by Yen Press. The volume was released on November 10, 2020.

Live-action film
In January 2022, it was announced that the manga would receive a live action film adaptation, starring Mei Nagano as Shiino. The film premiered on September 30, 2022.

Reception
My Broken Mariko won the Tokyo News Services' TV Bros magazine Bros. Comic Award 2020. It won the New Face Award at the 24th Japan Media Arts Festival in 2021. It ranked #4 on Takarajimasha's Kono Manga ga Sugoi! list of best manga of 2021 for female readers.

References

Further reading

External links

Japanese webcomics
Josei manga
Kadokawa Shoten manga
Live-action films based on manga
Manga adapted into films
Webcomics in print
Yen Press titles